The Division of Mackellar is an Australian electoral division in the state of New South Wales.

History

The division is named after Sir Charles Mackellar, a social reformer and surgeon who served in the Senate from October to November 1903, and his daughter Dorothea Mackellar, a 20th-century Australian poet. The division was proclaimed at the redistribution of 11 May 1949, and was first contested at the 1949 federal election. It was first held by Bill Wentworth, the first Minister for Aboriginal Affairs, and the great-grandson of politician and explorer William Wentworth, one of the first three Europeans to cross the Blue Mountains.

Like most seats in northern Sydney, Mackellar was a safe seat for the Liberal Party of Australia for the majority of its history. Prior to 2022, for all but two months of its existence, the seat was held by Liberal MPs; Wentworth briefly sat as an independent for the last two months of his term. The territory covered by the electorate had been represented by centre-right MPs for most of its history since Federation; it was part of North Sydney before 1922, and then part of Warringah from 1922 to 1949.

In 1972, Wentworth only tallied 55.2 percent of the two party vote. This election was also the first time the Liberals had come up short of winning enough votes on the first count to win the seat outright. It would be half a century before the Liberals’ hold on the seat would be seriously threatened again.

Former Speaker of the House of Representatives Bronwyn Bishop held the seat from 1994 until 2016, when she lost a preselection contest for the Liberal Party candidacy following an expenses scandal. The Liberal Party preselected Jason Falinski to contest the seat, who won both the 2016 and 2019 Federal elections.

Following the 2022 federal election, a Liberal candidate lost the election for the first time in the seat's history. Falinski lost over 11 percent of his primary vote from 2019, and was unseated by teal independent Sophie Scamps as part of a wave of Liberal losses in wealthy metropolitan seats.

Boundaries
Since 1984, federal electoral division boundaries in Australia have been determined at redistributions by a redistribution committee appointed by the Australian Electoral Commission. Redistributions occur for the boundaries of divisions in a particular state, and they occur every seven years, or sooner if a state's representation entitlement changes or when divisions of a state are malapportioned.

The division is located in the Northern Beaches region of Sydney, adjacent to the Tasman Sea, south of Broken Bay and the Hawkesbury River. The division includes the suburbs of Akuna Bay, Avalon Beach, Bayview, Belrose, Bilgola Beach, Bilgola Plateau, Careel Bay, Church Point, Clareville, Coasters Retreat, Collaroy, Collaroy Plateau, Cottage Point, Cromer, Davidson, Duffys Forest, Elanora Heights, Elvina Bay, Great Mackerel Beach, Ingleside, Lovett Bay, McCarrs Creek, Mona Vale, Morning Bay, Narrabeen, Newport, North Narrabeen, Oxford Falls, Palm Beach, Scotland Island, Terrey Hills, Towlers Bay, Warriewood, Whale Beach, and Wheeler Heights; as well as parts of Beacon Hill, Dee Why, Forestville, Frenchs Forest, and Narraweena.

Members

Election results

References

External links
 Division of Mackellar - Australian Electoral Commission

Electoral divisions of Australia
Constituencies established in 1949
1949 establishments in Australia
Northern Beaches